The 1954 Prairie View A&M Panthers football team was an American football team that represented Prairie View A&M University in the Southwestern Athletic Conference (SWAC) during the 1954 college football season. In their sixth season under head coach Billy Nicks, the Panthers compiled a perfect 10–1 record (6–0 against conference opponents), won the SWAC championship, defeated  in the Prairie View Bowl, and outscored opponents by a total of 255 to 116.  The Panthers were recognized as a 1953 black college national co-champion.

Schedule

References

Prairie View AandM
Prairie View A&M Panthers football seasons
Black college football national champions
Southwestern Athletic Conference football champion seasons
Prairie View AandM Football